Chandlodiya railway station is a railway station in Ahmedabad district, Gujarat, India on the Western line of the Western railway network. It serves Chandlodiya area of Ahmedabad city. Passenger, Express, and Superfast trains halt here.

Nearby stations

Ambli road is the nearest railway station towards , whereas  is the nearest railway station towards . The other part of Chandlodiya railway station is Chandlodiya B on the Mehsana line.

Chandlodiya B Railway station 

Its station code is CLDYB and is present at 1 km away from Chandlodiya railway station. It is present on Jaipur - Ahmedabad line and Viramgam - Khodiyar line. Here there are 2 platforms and 3 tracks are present. It joins trains from Saurashtra and Kutch towards Delhi, Rajasthan and Uttar Pradesh by saving time train by not going to Ahmedabad Junction or Sabarmati Junction. So train passing from here are as follow:

 Gandhinagar Capital - Indore Shanti Express
 Ala Hazrat Express (via Ahmedabad)
 Porbandar–Delhi Sarai Rohilla Superfast Express
 Porbandar–Muzaffarpur Express
 Anand - Gandhinagar MEMU

Trains

The following Express and Superfast trains halt at Chandlodiya railway station in both directions:

 Mumbai Central - Porbandar Saurashtra Express
 Somnath - Jabalpur Express (via Itarsi)
 Somnath - Jabalpur Express (via Bina)
 Mumbai Central - Okha Saurashtra Mail
 Bandra - Veraval Saurashtra Janta Express
 Gorakhpur - Okha Express
 Vadodara - Jamnagar Intercity Superfast Express 
 Ahmedabad - Viramgam MEMU

References 

Railway stations in Ahmedabad district
Ahmedabad railway division